The 2019 Cork Senior Football Championship was the 131st staging of the Cork Senior Football Championship since its establishment by the Cork County Board in 1887. The draw for the opening round fixtures took place on 15 January 2019. The championship began on 18 March 2019 and ended on 27 October 2019.

St. Finbarr's entered the championship as the defending champions, however, they were beaten by Nemo Rangers at the quarter-final stage. Femoy secured promotion to the top tier championship after a 54-year absence.

On 27 October 2019, Nemo Rangers won the championship after a 2–08 to 0–10 defeat of Duhallow in the final at Páirc Uí Rinn. It was their 21st championship overall and their first title since 2017. It was a second successive final defeat for Duhallow.

John Hayes from the Carbery Rangers club was the championship's top scorer with 2-20.

Team changes

To Championship

Promoted from the Cork Premier Intermediate Football Championship
 Fermoy

Results

Divisional/colleges section

Preliminary round

Round 1

Round 2

Round 3

Quarter-finals

Semi-finals

Final

Championship statistics

Top scorers

Top scorers overall

Top scorers in a single game

References

External links
 Cork GAA website

Cork Senior Football Championship
Cork Senior Football Championship
Cork SFC